Rasbora myersi is a species of freshwater cyprinid fish in the genus Rasbora from south-east Asia.

References 

Rasboras
Cyprinid fish of Asia
Taxa named by Martin Ralph Brittan
Fish described in 1954